Dutch Neck is an unincorporated community located within West Windsor Township in Mercer County, New Jersey, United States. The community is centered about the intersection of Village Road and South Mill Road and has in the vicinity numerous churches, West Windsor Volunteer Fire Company No. 1, Dutch Neck Elementary School, and many residences. The community was founded by the Voorhees and Bergen families c. 1737.

In October 2019, the Historical Society of West Windsor published an online museum exploring the history of West Windsor, including that of Dutch Neck.

References

West Windsor, New Jersey
Unincorporated communities in Mercer County, New Jersey
Unincorporated communities in New Jersey